Coleotechnites mackiei is a moth of the family Gelechiidae. It is found in North America, where it has been recorded from California.

The larvae feed on the berries of Manzanita species.

References

Moths described in 1931
Coleotechnites